Algoma Sault, which entered service in 2018, is the third freighter Algoma Central named after Sault Ste. Marie, Ontario. She is a self-unloading bulk carrier, built for carrying cargoes like ore, grain, or coal, on the North American Great Lakes and St. Lawrence Seaway.

Design and description
The Equinox class were designed for Algoma Central in an effort to modernise their fleet of ships operating on the Great Lakes and St. Lawrence Seaway. The main element of the design was to improve fuel efficiency and to reduce its environmental impact. The ship is powered by a Tier II compliant diesel engine with a fully integrated IMO-approved exhaust gas scrubber that removes over 98% of all sulphur oxides from shipboard emissions, creating . The engine turns a single  propeller.

Algoma Sault has a  self-discharging boom.

Construction and career
The vessel was constructed by Jiangsu Newyangzi SB, at their yard in Jingjiang, China in 2017 and given the yard number 2015-1243. The ship was completed in January 2018 and registered in Funafuti, Tuvalu. The ship departed China on 3 February 2018 and crossed the Pacific Ocean, arriving in Canada in late March where the ship was re-flagged to Canada. Like  before her, Algoma Sault is named for Sault Ste. Marie, Ontario, as a tribute to the relationship between Algoma Central and city. She is the third vessel of Algoma Central's fleet to be named after the city. Algoma Sault is the second self-unloading Equinox-class bulk carrier and the seventh ship of the class overall. The ship entered service in 2018 and sails on the Great Lakes and St. Lawrence Seaway delivering dry bulk cargoes such as wheat, and road salt.

Citations

References
 
 
 
 
 

Great Lakes freighters
Algoma Central Marine
Ships built in China
2018 ships